Garozzo is a surname. Notable people with the surname include:

 Benito Garozzo (born 1927), Italian-American bridge player
 Enrico Garozzo (born 1989), Italian épée fencer
 Daniele Garozzo (born 1992), Italian foil fencer, brother of Enrico

Italian-language surnames